The New Left is a term used for activists in the United Kingdom and United States who sought a broad range of reforms in the 1960s-70s.

New Left may also refer to:

Political groups and movements

New Left (China), a school of political thought in China
New Left (Croatia), a Croatian political party
New Left (Montenegro), a Montenegrin extra-parliamentary political party
New Left in France, an organized caucus in the French Socialist Party
New Left group, the current name of the socialist group in the French National Assembly
New Left (Trentino-Alto Adige/Südtirol), a list in the 1978 Trentino-Alto Adige/Südtirol regional election in Italy
New Left in Japan, the Japanese offshoot of the Western New Left movement
New Left (Poland), a Polish political party
New Left 95, a political movement in Lithuania
New Left Movement (Peru), a Peruvian political party

Other uses
The New Left (band), an American band co-founded by Kyle Cook of Matchbox Twenty
The New Left: The Anti-Industrial Revolution, a collection of essays by Ayn Rand

See also
New Right (disambiguation)